Alexander Leslie-Melville, 10th Earl of Leven, 9th Earl of Melville (1817–1889)

He was the son of John Leslie-Melville, 9th Earl of Leven.
He was a partner in Williams. Deacon & Co, and was a Representative Peer for Scotland (Conservative) from 1880 to 1889.

He was succeeded by his half-brother Ronald Ruthven Leslie-Melville, 11th Earl of Leven, 10th Earl of Melville (1835–1906).

References

External links

1817 births
1889 deaths
Earls of Leven
Scottish representative peers